Amber Christine Liu Chang (born July 6, 1984) is an American former professional tennis player who is also the wife of fellow tennis pro Michael Chang.  At Stanford University, she was a two-time NCAA singles champion in 2003 and 2004.  Her highest ranking was World No. 241 in singles and No. 600 in doubles.

Career

College
Liu attended Stanford University from 2002 to 2006, where she studied economics, interned in investment banking at Goldman Sachs, and played on the women's tennis team, compiling a 94–23 record in singles and leading the team to become NCAA team champions for three straight years, 2004 to 2006.  She was a two-time NCAA singles champion in 2003 and 2004, NCAA doubles finalist in 2005, and four-time All-American.  Liu was the fourth Stanford women's player to become a two-time NCAA singles champion, following Patty Fendick, Sandra Birch and Laura Granville. In 2004, she won the Honda Sports Award as the nation's best female tennis player.

2005
Liu injured her shoulder in the summer of 2005, which caused her ranking to drop.

2008
In July, Liu was invited as a wildcard to play women's singles at the Bank of the West Classic held at her alma mater Stanford University.  There she played her final match as a professional, losing in the first round to fifth-seeded and World No. 13 Patty Schnyder of Switzerland.

Personal life
Her parents are Marvin and Valerie Liu, both Stanford graduates. Her father is a physician and her mother is an attorney. Liu was coached by Emmanuel Udozorh and International Tennis Hall of Fame inductee Michael Chang. Chang and Liu married on October 18, 2008, and have two daughters, Lani (born December 9, 2010) and Maile (born February 2013).

ITF Circuit finals

Singles 4 (2–2)

See also
 NCAA Women's Tennis Championship

References

External links
 
 
 
 

1984 births
Living people
American female tennis players
Goldman Sachs people
Sportspeople from San Diego County, California
Stanford Cardinal women's tennis players
Tennis players from Santa Monica, California
Chinese-American tennis players
American investment bankers
Stanford University alumni
American sportswomen of Chinese descent